Ghimpu is a Romanian surname that may refer to one of three brothers from Moldova:

Gheorghe Ghimpu (1937–2000), Romanian politician and political prisoner
Mihai Ghimpu (born 1951), Moldovan politician
Simion Ghimpu (1939–2010), Moldovan writer

Romanian-language surnames